A general election was held in the U.S. state of Wyoming on Tuesday, November 7, 1978. All of the state's executive officers—the Governor, Secretary of State, Auditor, Treasurer, and Superintendent of Public Instruction—were up for election. Democratic Governor Edgar Herschler won a narrow re-election to a second term, and Democrat Lynn Simons was elected Superintendent of Public Instruction, narrowly defeating incumbent Republican Robert G. Schroder. Republicans won the remainder of the statewide offices.

Governor

Incumbent Democratic Governor Edgar Herschler ran for re-election to a second term, and faced former State Senator John Ostlund, the Republican nominee, in the general election. Herschler's margin of victory narrowed considerably from 1974, but he narrowly won re-election over Ostlund.

Secretary of State
Incumbent Republican Secretary of State Thyra Thomson ran for re-election to a fifth term. She faced Ed Sencabaugh, an executive with the Union Pacific Railroad and a former State Representative, in the Republican primary. She handily defeated him, and advanced to the general election. No Democratic candidates filed to oppose Thomson, though Robert Warburton, a college student, received 54 write-in votes and was offered the nomination. He ultimately declined it, leaving the Democrats with no candidate and Thomson with no opponent, enabling her to win re-election unopposed.

Republican primary

Candidates
 Thyra Thomson, incumbent Secretary of State
 Ed Sencabaugh, Union Pacific Railroad executive, former State Representative from Albany County

Results

General election

Results

Auditor
Incumbent Republican State Auditor Jim Griffith ran for re-election to a second term. He faced no opposition in the Republican primary and no Democratic candidate initially filed against him. But Jim Polis, a bank examiner in the State Examiner's office, received enough write-in votes to receive his party's nomination, which he accepted. However, Polis did not present significant challenge to Griffith, who won re-election by a lopsided margin.

Democratic primary
No Democratic candidates filed for State Auditor. However, Jim Polis, a bank examiner at the State Examiner's office, received 329 write-in votes and was offered the nomination, which he accepted.

Republican primary

Candidates
 Jim Griffith, incumbent State Auditor

Results

General election

Results

Treasurer
Incumbent Republican State Treasurer Ed Witzenburger was unable to seek re-election due to term limits and instead opted to run for Congress, ultimately losing to Dick Cheney in the Republican primary. In the Republican primary, Deputy Treasurer Shirley Wittler won a narrow victory over Craig L. Thomas. In the general election, she faced former State Representative Bob Adams, a perennial candidate for statewide office. She defeated Adams in a landslide, becoming only the second woman, after Minnie A. Mitchell, to serve as State Treasurer.

Democratic primary

Candidates
 Bob Adams, former State Representative, former State Representative from Laramie County, 1974 Democratic nominee for Auditor, 1970 Democratic candidate for Treasurer, 1966 Democratic nominee for Treasurer, 1962 Democratic nominee for Treasurer, 1958 Democratic nominee for State Auditor, 1954 Democratic nominee for State Auditor
 Ed Dover, salesman

Results

Republican primary

Candidates
 Shirley Wittler, Deputy State Treasurer
 Craig L. Thomas, general manager of the Wyoming Rural Electric Association

Results

General election

Results

Superintendent of Public Instruction
Incumbent Republican Superintendent of Public Instruction Robert G. Schrader ran for re-election to a third term. He faced a strong challenge in the Republican primary from Converse County Superintendent of Schools Millard I. Meredith. Though Schrader defeated Meredith, he did so by a relatively close margin. In the Democratic primary, meanwhile, Lynn Simons, the former Chairwoman of the Wyoming Board of Education, defeated Sydney Spiegel, a history teacher who ran as the 1974 Democratic nominee for Superintendent. Simons ultimately defeated Schrader by a slim margin, receiving the highest percentage of vote of any statewide Democratic candidate.

Democratic primary

Candidates
 Lynn Simons, former Chairwoman of the State Board of Education
 Sydney Spiegel, Cheyenne history teacher, 1974 Democratic nominee for Superintendent

Results

Republican primary

Candidates
 Robert G. Schrader, incumbent State Superintendent of Public Instruction
 Millard I. Meredith, Converse County Superintendent of Schools

Results

General election

Results

References

 
Wyoming